The untitled seventh studio album by German Neue Deutsche Härte band Rammstein, titled Rammstein on digital platforms and on CD-Text enabled devices, was released on 17 May 2019 through Universal Music. Their first studio album in ten years, it is their first not to be produced by Jacob Hellner; it was instead produced by Emigrate guitarist Olsen Involtini, who also serves as Rammstein's live sound engineer.

The album received positive reviews from critics. It was also commercially successful, reaching number one in over ten countries. It set a record for the most units of an album sold in its first week in Germany during the 21st century, and was the best-selling album of 2019 in Germany, Austria, and Switzerland. It was also certified 3× Platinum by the BVMI for selling at least 600,000 copies in Germany. The album was supported by the singles "Deutschland", "Radio", and "Ausländer", with "Deutschland" becoming their second number-one hit in Germany and the other two entering the top 5.

Composition 
The album's overall sound has been described as Neue Deutsche Härte, industrial metal, and electro-industrial. "Zeig Dich" criticizes the Catholic church. Backed by "powerful thumping guitar riffs", the lyrics demand religious leaders to "stop hiding behind their so-called Lord". The composition also features a Latin-language choir and Spanish-styled finger picking. Louder thought the song is reminiscent of Mutters "Zwitter". "Sex" discusses sex as something "'disgusting', yet life-giving" and reminded the portal of Rob Zombie and Queens of the Stone Age. "Puppe" contains a strong doom metal influence, and tells the story of a child playing with their doll in a room while their sister - presumably underage - prostitutes herself at the room beside theirs. As the sister screams, the child grows increasingly agitated until they start biting the doll's head off. The ending verses suggest the child eventually sneaks into the sister's room, finds her being beaten to death and kills the attacker. The instrumentation was described by Louder as having "eerie synths, jangling guitars and pummelling vocals".

"Was Ich Liebe" has elements of Nine Inch Nails' "Closer" and an acoustic guitar section sounding like "Stairway to Heaven", by Led Zeppelin, while "Diamant" is a soft ballad describing "a breakneck voyage through the multifaceted stages of romantic despair". "Weit Weg" has elements of Tangerine Dream and Kosmischer Läufer and its lyrics describe a man secretly watching a woman undress through a window, and could be "an allegory for the way cam girls (or, sex workers more broadly) are put at risk from the blurred realities of some of their clients who believe their interactions to be more than they are". "Tattoo" evokes thrash and heavy metal of the 1980s and early 1990s. The lyrics allude to the identification of inmates in German concentration camps while also discussing tattoos as a modern trend. The ending track "Hallomann" is about a child abuser who lures a girl into his car and drowns her later and features "thrumming bass, eerie synths, kick-your-back-door in riffs and a goosebump-inducing vocal".

Promotion and release 
In January 2019, Richard Kruspe said there would be five music videos created for the album. Teaser clips for the first music video were released in late March. These clips featured visuals from the video along with the Roman numerals for the date 28 March 2019. On that day, the song "Deutschland" was released as the album's lead single on digital platforms, and its 10-minute-long music video was uploaded onto YouTube. The single also came with a remix by Kruspe. The band said the album had no title and would be released on 17 May 2019. The music video was viewed 19 million times in the first four days after its release. "Deutschland" was released physically as both a 7-inch vinyl and CD single on 12 April, with the remix acting as the B-side. The track list was revealed between 16 April and 19 April on the band's YouTube channel with snippets of riffs from each song. The cover of the album was also revealed there on 18 April. The twenty-seconds video teaser with the album cover presentation featured shots of Kakhovska square in Ukrainian city of Kherson. Less than a week later, the band began teasing a music video for the song "Radio", which was released on 26 April.

The album was released on 17 May 2019 through Universal Music. It was distributed by Vertigo/Capitol in Europe, Spinefarm Records in the United Kingdom, and Caroline International in the United States. Physically, it received a double-180 gram vinyl release and two different CD releases. Both CD releases featured digipak packaging and booklets, with the deluxe edition having more panels and a larger booklet. On 26 May, the band teased a music video for the album's third single, "Ausländer". The video was released on 28 May and the single was released on 31 May.

Reception

Critical

The album received positive reviews.  On review aggregator website Metacritic, it holds an average review score of 82/100, based on 11 reviews indicating "universal acclaim". In a positive review, NME wrote, "this album is undoubtedly a resounding triumph". Nick Ruskell at Kerrang! wrote, "this is a record made with care, craft, and nothing allowed in that isn't just-so". Wall of Sound gave the album 9.5/10 stating: "Rammstein is seemingly a culmination of the previous six studio albums, taking the best parts of the last few decades and putting it all in one album, while throwing in a few unexpected surprises." Kory Grow of Rolling Stone wrote, "In some ways, Rammstein have grown up in their decade of hibernation but mostly they have not. The band had ascended in the anything-goes nu-metal Nineties, blending new-wave synths with air-tight heavy-metal guitar riffs and disco drumbeats... Over time, their sound became more polished and more rigid (and by proxy more Germanic?) but they still held onto their puerile impulses. “Deutschland” is the only song of any lyrical consequence on Rammstein — the rest piddle between the benign and letchy. But because it's all in German, it's not entirely clear which is which." Lukas Wojcicky in his review for Exclaim! commented, "Rammstein's Untitled is believed by many to be the band's swan song, as each member's age hovers around 50. Considering the band hadn't released an album in ten years, a retirement announcement would not have come as a surprise, but instead we got one final album and at least a couple of years of touring to follow. For this reason, this album is a welcome addition to Rammstein's discography and one that will be chanted with equal fervour when they come to a city near you."

Commercial
The album debuted atop the German album charts on issue date 24 May 2019. In the first week in Germany, it moved 260,000 album-equivalent units, making it the best-performing album in the first week from a band in the 21st century. The album spent the next two weeks at No. 2 before climbing back up to No. 1 on 14 June. It spent two more non-consecutive weeks at No. 1 afterward. The album also spent an entire year inside the top 40 of the chart, not leaving it until 12 June 2020. Additionally, it spent 127 consecutive weeks in the chart before leaving it on the week of 29 October 2021.

Elsewhere, the album peaked at No. 3 on the UK Albums Chart, selling 12,130 copies and spent three consecutive weeks atop the UK Rock & Metal Albums Chart. In the United States, the album peaked at No. 9 on the Billboard 200, earning 28,000 album-equivalent units in its first week. The album is the band's first to reach the top 10 in the United States. Additionally, it topped the Hard Rock Albums chart, the second Rammstein album to do so (previously Liebe ist für alle da in 2009) and World Albums chart, which make it the first German-language studio album to top this chart (previously Rammstein: Paris, a live album, topped this chart, in 2017). On 15 April 2020, the album was certified 5× Gold by the Bundesverband Musikindustrie for sales of over 500,000 album-equivalent units in Germany.

Accolades

Track listing

Personnel 

Rammstein
Till Lindemann – lead vocals, music, lyrics
Richard Kruspe – lead guitar, music, lyrics, backing vocals 
Oliver Riedel – bass guitar, music, lyrics
Paul Landers – rhythm guitar, music, lyrics
Christian Lorenz – keyboards, music, lyrics
Christoph Schneider – drums, music, lyrics

Additional musicians
The Academic Choir and the Symphony Orchestra of the National Television and Radio Company of Belarus, Minsk – strings, choir (tracks 3 and 6)
Meral Al-Mer – backing vocals (tracks 1 and 10)
Carla Bruhn – backing vocals (track 11)

Technical personnel
Florian Ammon – engineer, editing
Ben Bazzazian – programming (track 4)
Lutz Buch – guitar technician
Daniel Cayotte – studio assistant
Siarhei Chaika – recording engineer (tracks 3 and 6)
Tom Dalgety – additional producer, recording engineer
Svante Forsbäck – mastering
Sven Helbig – choir and string arrangements (tracks 3 and 6)
Olsen Involtini – producer, mixer, recording engineer
Dzmitry Karshakevich – recording engineer
Wilhelm Keitel – conductor (tracks 3 and 6)
Rammstein – producer
Rossi Rossberg – drum technician
Sky van Hoff – additional producer, recording engineer

Other personnel
Jes Larsen – photography
Rocket & Wink – artwork

Charts

Weekly charts

Year-end charts

Decade-end charts

Certifications

Release history

References 

2019 albums
German-language albums
Rammstein albums
Universal Records albums